Yang Huiping (born 16 June 1969) is a Chinese former field hockey player. She competed in the women's tournament at the 2000 Summer Olympics.

References

External links
 

1969 births
Living people
Chinese female field hockey players
Olympic field hockey players of China
Field hockey players at the 2000 Summer Olympics
Place of birth missing (living people)
Asian Games medalists in field hockey
Asian Games silver medalists for China
Asian Games bronze medalists for China
Medalists at the 1990 Asian Games
Medalists at the 1998 Asian Games
Field hockey players at the 1990 Asian Games
Field hockey players at the 1998 Asian Games